Ap Lei Chau Bridge is a highway bridge in Hong Kong connecting the island of Ap Lei Chau (Aberdeen Island) to the community of Aberdeen on Hong Kong Island.

First bridge
Completed in April 1977, the first bridge had one lane of traffic in each direction. It is a double-cantilever, prestressed-concrete bridge, with a  main span, two  side spans, and associated ramps. Maunsell & Partners were the bridge consultants.

Second bridge
Construction of the twin Second Ap Lei Chau Bridge on the north side of the first bridge was started in May 1991 and completed in July 1994 to provide two traffic lanes in each direction. Both sides of the bridge have pavements for pedestrian use.

Legislators approved funding for the Second Ap Lei Chau Bridge on 1 May 1991. It opened on 28 July 1994. The first person to drive across it was Kwong Hon-sang, Director of Highways, officiating at the opening ceremony.

The two bridges are Ap Lei Chau's only road links with Hong Kong Island. There is a railway bridge, the Aberdeen Channel Bridge, opened on 28 December 2016 as part of the MTR's South Island line.

See also

 Aberdeen Typhoon Shelters

References

Aberdeen, Hong Kong
Ap Lei Chau
Bridges in Hong Kong
Roads on Hong Kong Island